Rossburg is an unincorporated community in Salt Creek Township, Decatur County, Indiana, U.S.A.

History
Rossburg was laid out in 1836. A post office was established at Rossburg in 1838, and remained in operation until it was discontinued in 1870.

Geography

References

Unincorporated communities in Decatur County, Indiana
Unincorporated communities in Indiana